Desquamative interstitial pneumonia (DIP) is a form of idiopathic interstitial pneumonia featuring elevated numbers of macrophages within the alveoli (air sacs) of the lung. The alveolar macrophages have a characteristic light brown pigmentation and accumulate in the alveolar lumen and septa regions of the lower lobes of the lungs. The typical effects of the macrophage accumulation are inflammation and later fibrosis (thickening and stiffness) of the lung tissue. 

The term DIP is a misnomer. Its name is derived from the former belief that these macrophages were pneumocytes that had desquamated. It has been suggested that a more accurate term for cases of DIP that occur in smokers and feature "ropey" alveolar septal collagen is Smoking-related interstitial fibrosis (SRIF).

It is associated with patients with a history of smoking. Since more than 80% of cases occur in smokers, it has been suggested that the term DIP should be discarded and the subset occurring in smokers should be replaced with more accurate terms such as smoking-related interstitial fibrosis (SRIF). Although smoking is the most common cause, studies have shown a relationship between occupational exposures and the development of DIP, including occupational dust, fire-extinguisher powder, diesel fumes, nylon filaments and beryllium and copper dust. Additionally, DIP has been observed in children where it typically presents as a result of surfactant protein gene mutations, indicating that the disease is not always acquired in adulthood.

Smoking cessation and avoidance of secondhand smoke exposure are both crucial to preventing disease progression, however, treatment with corticosteroids and immunosuppressive therapy has been reported to be effective pharmacologic intervention. Treatment with methylprednisolone has been reported.

References

External links 

Histopathology
Pneumonia